Budapesti Közlekedési Zrt. or BKV Zrt. ("Budapest Transit Company", the abbreviation BKV stands for its earlier name Budapesti Közlekedési Vállalat) is the main public transport operator in Budapest, Hungary. BKV was established in 1968 as a unified public transport company with the merger of the companies responsible for the different means of transport; bus operator FAÜ, tram and trolleybus operator FVV, suburban railway operator BHÉV and riverboat operator FHV. The metro was added in 1973. The transport in Budapest underwent another reorganization in 2010 when the BKK (Budapesti Közlekedési Központ, "Budapest Transit Centre") was founded for the management of the city transport and infrastructure.

Since then, BKV is the largest public transport contractor of BKK, operating 4 metro, 33 tram, and 15 trolley bus lines, and 30% of the 231 local bus and 40 night bus lines.

Road vehicle operation

City-owned BKV runs most of the vehicles of the extensive network of surface mass transportation in Budapest, with the emphasis on buses. The 400 buses in Budapest (the majority of which are Mercedes-Benz Citaro) circulate on 30% of the 231 routes. The  buses are painted skyblue. Trolleybuses in red livery are operated on 15 lines. The night service is provided exclusively by buses and by the trams on Great Boulevard. The articulated bus is a hallmark of Budapest; both diesel and ETB bendy vehicles have been running since the late 1950s and still form the majority of BKV's fleet.

The late-2000s road rebuilding effort (affecting 50% of the city's principal roadways) also changed the lanes, creating distinct lanes for vehicles turning left at traffic-light crossings, for example. This reduced the travel time of the buses. Completing the eastern sector of M0 beltway around the city in 2008 significantly reduced traffic congestion, the inauguration of Metro Line 4 in 2014 further helped the situation. Competitive wages are still a serious issue as bus drivers are often lured to the trucking industry.

Rail services

BKV operates 33 city tram lines, including the Budapest Cog Railway that operates as tram line 60. The once-extensive network of tram tracks and the brown striped yellow trams were a characteristic of Budapest, but the network was curtailed under Communism owing to lack of funding. Line 4-6 is still the largest capacity tram-line in Europe. The tram services are now set to have a renaissance as there is no further road capacity for bus lanes in Budapest. Replacing the more than 40-year-old rolling stock started in 2006 with new 54-meter long Siemens Combino Supra giants completely replacing former carriages on the 4-6 line.

The underground railway network is less extensive, consisting of four lines. The M1 line (or Földalatti), whose colour is yellow, is a small underground tramway inaugurated in 1896. The other three are full-sized metro lines: M2 (red), M3 (blue) and M4 (green). M2 and M4 run roughly east–west, while M3 runs mostly north–south. There is a plan for a high-speed rail link to Ferihegy BUD international airport, which is currently served by bus from the end of the M3 metro line. – See the main article Budapest Metro. In 2005 a "BEB" monthly pass was introduced for a 10% extra cost over the regular price, which permitted the use of the MÁV national railway lines within the city area, effectively increasing the tracked service for BKV's passengers. Since 2009, all monthly (and 15-day) passes, now called a "Budapest Pass", are valid on the national railway and suburban bus lines within city boundaries.

Passenger statistics

As of 2009, approximately 54% of the passenger traffic in Budapest, a city of 1.7 million inhabitants, is still carried by BKV vehicles, with the remaining 46% using private vehicles. During 2003 a total of 1.4 billion people travelled by BKV. During the Socialist era, Budapest had 2 million residents and its public vs. private transport ratio (the so-called modal split) was 80% : 20% in favor of mass transit. This ratio was a result of artificial restriction: COMECON rules did not allow Hungary to produce private cars domestically and Dacia / Lada / Škoda / Trabant / Wartburg (marque) car imports were never enough. (After the Iron Curtain fell, a large number of second hand cars were imported from Austria and Western Europe, leading to rapid private motorisation of Budapest's streets.)

Funding

After the fall of Communism, BKV was traditionally plagued by a lack of funding. It survived by selling some of its garages and repair bases for mall and housing development. As of October 2009 the average BKV diesel bus was 16.5 years old and the oldest one of the 1,400 strong fleet was 24 years old, with 3.5 million kilometers to its track record.  Yet starting in 2010, a bus replacement program scrapped most of those old buses and increased the ratio of modern, air-conditioned low-floor buses to 80% by 2016. Their share is planned to reach 100% by 2018.

In 2006, Siemens Combino Supra trams completely replaced the carriages serving the Grand Boulevard. In the same year, French Alstom metro trains were ordered to replace all Soviet carriages on metro line 2 and to serve on metro line 4, the construction of that line started in that year. All units for both lines entered service by 2014, in which year 47 air-conditioned, low-floor CAF trams were purchased. Their delivery will be completed by 2017. In 2016, the more than 30 years old Russian trains running on Metro Line 3, produced by Mytishchi Machine-building Factory, started to be reconstructed by the legal successor Metrowagonmash.

BKV operates on a net-loss basis; state-mandated ticket prices cover less than 50% of running costs. The state circumvents EU regulations by failing to fully compensate the BKV company for operating costs and amortization.

Corruption Scandal
In 2009-2010 investigations into corruption led the police examine all money logs and contracts of the 20-year period individually, to find issues unrelated to the already detected ones. Many high-level employees and independent or in-company participants were arrested and sentenced. This issue led the owner, the Local Government of the Capital City making BKV accept a new Company Inner Regulation System and its assembly enacting local government degrees guaranteeing complete transparency in the contracts, billings, and job descriptions for the owner, and for all representatives of its assembly even individually. This regulation was extended to all enterprises owned in majority by the city council.

Season tickets and passes
 
BKV uses a paper-based system of tickets and passes; as of December 2015 a monthly pass allowing one adult to travel on any BKV vehicle costs  (approximately). Students (of any age) and children get a discount of around 65%; the elderly travel free. Passes are not transferable.

There are plans to introduce smartcard passes and tickets within a few years, in an attempt to reduce the significant fare evasion (estimated at around 10% of  all passengers).

See also the usage of the Budapest Metro.

People with disabilities

Most of the BKV buses are wheelchair accessible. There are also a few small-sized special BKV buses, which can be reserved by phone to transport a person using a wheelchair. The M4 metro line has public lifts installed in every station. Most of the current M2 and M3 metro stations only have escalators. After the renewal, all of the stations will have lifts at m2 and M3, except Pöttyös utca and Ecseri út. After the renewal, all of the stations will have lifts at M1.

Currently available regular service line with handicapped-compatible low-floor vehicles:

Metro
 line M1: Only stations Deák tér, Széchenyi fürdő, Mexikói út (a disabled person has to ask for the operator of the wheelchair lift; lifts non-functional since at least 2009)
 line M2: Only stations Puskás Ferenc Stadion, Pillangó utca, Örs vezér tere
 line M3: Only stations Kőbánya-Kispest (under reconstruction), Forgách utca, Gyöngyösi utca, Újpest-Városkapu, Újpest-Központ (the list will likely expand after the lines’ full reconstruction)
 line M4: All stations
Tram
 1: all vehicles at weekends (33-50% at weekdays)
 3: most of the vehicles
 4, 6: all vehicles
 17, 19: half of the vehicles
 24G: some vehicles in the after morning and evening peak times
Nearly all of the bus and trolleybus lines have low-floor buses most of the time, except for bus lines 39, 116, 121, 161A, 171, 225, 251 (most of them due to traffic engineering characteristics). The metro replacement buses (operating on the southern part of Metro Line M3) are only serviced by low-floor buses.

Description of major vehicle types used by BKV

Buses

Present fleet

The type is a serious failure, manufactured during the final decline of the Ikarus company; literally no two vehicles are identical in the 412 fleet. A number of vehicles have been already refurbished since 2009. Several engine compartment fires forced BKV to rebuild the propulsion cells and the chassis is still prone to fracture. Suffers from narrower rear door and gangway. The reduced size of the rear passenger doors can cause problems during peak hours. All of which are painted in a light shade of blue.
The longest bus in BKV's fleet, and also the most environmentally friendly one, fitted with a Euro-5 engine. Currently on a 3-year lease to BKV by Ikarus, though the company is considering purchasing the vehicle after the lease period ends.
 Volvo 7700: Polish made, BKV bought 38 used Volvo 7700 vehicles in 2012 to replace Ikarus 412's in the hilly routes of Buda, where they ran unreliably. (The 412's were reassigned to generally flatter areas in Pest.) These Volvos finally entered service in early 2013 and are painted in a light shade of blue officially termed "sky blue". They are equipped with automatic climate control.
Considered a technological marvel by experts for cramming four double doors and a usable gangway into a fully low-floor vehicle with vertically mounted engine. Current fleet of 150 arrived in three batches of fifty in 2004/2005/2006; the latest model is extremely advanced. Some passengers do not like them because of the cramped standing areas (low floor design causes slimmer standing areas), and slower run times (due to poor road conditions, especially on the 7-173 line). During their service years, they became liked vehicles because of their higher comfort level and quietness. All of them have automatic climate control, (the first 50 was equipped with it later), which is unique to BKV's bus fleet.
At BKV they were equipped with automatic climate control, Unlike the AG300, these have been repainted in BKV's signature blue livery. A further 49 Van Hool newA330 buses were purchased from Dijon and Lausanne, with these being powered by CNG and equipped with automatic climate control.
The AG300 is a special type of fully low-floor buses - the engine is located between the first and the second axles, so the third axle can be steered. 32 of them were bought by BKV in the summer of 2009 to ease the lack of modern vehicles. They were built in 2000-2001 and used in Brussels. At BKV they were equipped with automatic climate control, and were repainted into standard colors in 2013. 25 more were purchased in 2015 from Utrecht, these being the newer newAG300. Passengers noticed them for narrow inner space of the fore part, although the back has rather a large standee place.

Mercedes-Benz Citaro, purchased in 2011 and preliminary entered service in 2012, these buses have been bought used from various Western-European cities. All have been retrofitted them with larger windows and the standard BKV colors. Similar buses are also owned by Volánbusz. 150 brand new Citaros were purchased in 2013, and are operated by VT-Transman.

Former types
Considered the "workhorse", it negotiated poor road conditions and heavy use easily, but passengers suffered a lot of noise and vibration from the under-floor mounted engine. Their age often caused concern both among laymen and experts, but their exceptionally sturdy and serviceable build allowed them to reach an age of approximately 30 years. The last remaining vehicles were taken out service in November 2022.
A longer and more modern version of Ikarus 260.
 Ikarus 280: Hungarian made articulated version of the Ikarus 260; age of fleet between 27 and 34 years. Some of the fleet were entirely rebuilt in 1997 and painted in red-blue livery for use on 7-173 express routes, but from 2008 onwards, some of them were repainted in the standard blue. The last remaining vehicles were taken out service in November 2022.
The design was extremely compact, which resulted in a cramped passenger compartment. Equipped with fragile independent front suspension, it was prone to roll, but was still expected to run on hilly routes, for lack of a replacement. The reduced size of the front passenger doors could cause problems during peak hours. Most Ikarus 405 vehicles had tilted, 3 shade green striping painted at the front and back, except for those rebuilt in 2011 and 2012, which had blue-grey two-tone paint schemes instead. The majority had been replaced by the turkish made Karsan Atak, partially low-floor buses. The last remaining vehicles were taken out service in November 2022. 
Their rear-mounted DAF diesel engines were famous for their terrible roar, scaring passers-by, but the cab was quieter. The reduced size of the rear passenger doors on the later models could cause problems during peak hours. Almost all Ikarus 415 vehicles originally had tilted, 3 shade green striping at the front and rear, though the stripes had been removed from many of them during recent maintenance.. The last remaining vehicles were taken out service in November 2022.
Initially equipped with pusher-type articulated drive, they suffered a lot of technical problems and struggled with chassis weaknesses untill [sic] the end. The reduced size of the last pair of passenger doors could cause problems during peak hours. Along with the Ikarus 280 and Volvo 7700A, the Ikarus 435 was the workhorse of the BKV bus fleet. It was common to see rebuilt versions around the city. These vehicles had tilted, 3 shade green stripes at the front and back, which was gradually being phased out in recent repaints, as with Ikarus 415. The last remaining vehicles were taken out service in November 2022.
Only one bus is in service, given to BKV by Irisbus as compensation for delayed shipments.

VT Transman is one of BKK's contractors running some routes with their own vehicles, but those vehicles have blue-grey painting like BKV's, and they are completely integrated in BKK system. Volánbusz or its subsubcontractors runs suburban lines. But they are members of Budapest Transport Organization (BKSZ), so their lines can be used by regular tickets inside the city (300s, 600s, 700s, 800s and 2000s lines).

Trolleybuses

Present fleet
Ikarus 280T: Ikarus 280 articulated body equipped with Ganz chopper-based electronics. The last remaining vehicles will be taken out of service in spring 2023.
Limited fleet, resulting from the collapse of Ikarus and BKV's lack of funds during the late 1990s. The similar-looking, 11 m long 411T is, however, a unique vehicle which is a couple of years older: it was an Ikarus test trolleybus, and later it was transferred to BKV as a compensation for delayed shipments. The last remaining vehicles will be taken out of service in spring 2023.   
 Ikarus 435T: Ikarus 435 articulated body equipped with Kiepe electronics. The last remaining vehicles will be taken out of service in spring 2023.
 Gräf&Stift MAN NGE-152: Low-floor, articulated trolley buses bought used from the city of Eberswalde to replace the aging ZiU fleet. The last remaining vehicles will be taken out of service in spring 2023.
 Solaris Trollino: Polish-made fully low-floor  buses designed as genuine ETB vehicles. They do surprisingly well on bad Budapest roads, but the fleet is limited: BKV operates only 16 of them. Following the fiscal collapse of the Ganz Transelektro Group, the local co-manufacturer the delivery of the 2nd series was delayed for several months, and was finalized by Skoda, the new owner of Ganz Transelektro. In 2015, 36 new trolleybuses arrived. 12 of them are 18 meters long, with articulated body, the others the 12-meter long version. In 2019, 21 new trolleybuses arrived.

Former types

 ZiU-9: Withdrawn from service in late 2012, these  Soviet-made vehicles had partial semi-low floor at the rear. The age of fleet was 28–34 years, and the vehicles suffered from rust as well as degraded insulation of the electric drive system.

Trams

Present fleet

Almost every time they run single, but at the Grand Boulevard coupled. Similarly narrow-bodied as the UV type, they can be used on any BKV tram route. The name "Industrial" is used to distinguish the trams from the earlier "Home-made" articulated trams (commonly known as "Bengalis", no longer in service), built by BKV itself.
 KCSV-7: 30 of the 150 ICS has been re-bodied and rebuilt by Ganz-Ansaldo between 1996 and 1999, with passenger compartment heating and modernized engines. KCSV stands for Közúti Csuklós Villamos or Korszerűsített Csuklós Villamos (English: Articulated Tram for Public Road or Modernized Articulated Tram)

They either run in pairs or triples depending on demand. They are comfortable but their wider superstructure limits the lines they can serve. Some were rebuilt with better electronics in the early 2000s (decade).
 CKD T5C5K: CKD T5C5K is an upgraded version of the T5C5, with dot-matrix displays for informing passengers.
 Duewag TW 6000: Manufactured in West Germany between 1972 and 1973, very high floor trams, purchased in 2002 refurbished from the city of Hannover. These  vehicles only run as singles and are noted for their extremely quiet run (which did cause some minor accidents initially). Originally designed to serve as light-rail trains, the TW6000 vehicles have a variable door-well feature, which could serve tram stops in a step-free entry configuration. This feature is much appreciated by pregnant mothers and the elderly, but so far no money has been found to build the elevated platforms required to support it.
With six modules, as of 2008, they are the longest passenger trams of the world. Currently servicing lines 4 and 6, with some servicing line 1 but only on weekends.
CAF Urbos 3: After a dispute over the contract for new Budapest trams between Škoda and CAF, the latter company won the tender to supply the trams for Budapest. 37 were originally ordered, but this was increased to 47. There is also an option of a further 80 trams. 35 of the trams are 5-section 34 metre long trams for lines 3, 17 and 19, while 12 are 56 metre 9-section trams for line 1. The first arrived in Budapest in March 2015, and all were delivered by Summer 2016. The first 34-meter version entered service on line 3 in September 2015, with the first 56-meter version to entering service in March 2016 on line 1. In 2019, 26 new trams will arrive.5 of them 56-meter version for line 1. The others are 34-meter version, for lines 50 and 56.

Former types
 UV, (Series "U", remote controlled "távVezérelt"): built domestically during 1956-1965, based on pre-World War II designs and without heating. These cars were quite popular among tram enthusiasts of the world. When BKV celebrated its 50 years of service, an elaborate "UV Day" parade was one of the items. They usually ran in pairs, or pairs sandwiching a trailer (some of which were built in 1939). These cars were narrower than many of the later types, so that they fit the whole network including some tunnels. Despite this, they were withdrawn as of 2008, as spare parts were no longer available.

Other trains

Cogwheel Railway: 1970s era red carriages built by SGP of Austria are currently in service, but civil organizations are pushing for their replacement as well as the reconstruction of the entire track, which is unlikely to happen in near future, because of the cost.
MFAV: Domestically built double-articulated carriages from 1973 run on this line. Loosely based on the above-mentioned ICS tram technology, they feature three small carriages per set, in a fully low floor configuration. Likely to be replaced in the near future, MFAV vehicles are noted for high maintenance requirements, dictated by the cramped engine nacelles (needed to fit the tiny 100-year-old tunnel).
Underground: Until 2013, both M2 and M3 lines were served by 5- or 6-carriage trains of Soviet origin. These Mytishchi Factory-built metro vehicles are noisy, consuming too much power and show a lot of wear after 25+ years of service. Nine trains were refurbished from 2000 to 2003 but this did not significantly improve passenger comfort. BKV bought 37 Alstom Metropolis for the M2 and M4 lines. There were some problems about the delivery, and at March 2010, BKV CEO István Kocsis declared that BKV may cancel the contract with Alstom because of so many delays and problems (at M2 the new carriages should have been serving since February 2009, but they weren't yet). All soviet trains older than 30 years old (in total 43 carriages) were withdrawn from service after a serious fire broke out on line M3 which had no fatalities, but the first two carriages of the train were destroyed. (A peculiarity is that most of the withdrawn carriages were of a different type than the destroyed train, and a large quantity of them were already refurbished.) The Alstom Metropolis trains soon got the go ahead and testings began in the summer of 2012. The first train entered service on September 7 on line M2. All of the old Soviet-built metro trains on line M2 were taken out of service on April 30, 2013. Some of these were transferred to line M3 to increase capacity, but most were scrapped. The Soviet-built trains on line M3 have been refurbished in 2017-2018 by Metrowagonmash. They were repainted black and white, earning the nickname "Panda". They also installed separators between the carriages to stop people from climbing in-between them.

Miscellaneous vehicles
 Massive yellow-blue trucks and orange-painted lorries are used by BKV to repair overhead wires. They are equipped with blue rotating lights and sirens and are thus authorized to ignore road traffic regulations when dealing with an emergency.
 Orange minivans and white Renault trucks are used to repair buses on site, these only have orange warning lights.

Livery and colours
BKV paints its vehicles different colours by type.
 Trams: yellow
 HÉV vehicles: green and white
 Trolleybuses: red
 Buses: sky blue
 Night buses: sky blue (black on timetable)
Originally the buses had a dark shade of blue, most of the vehicles have been repainted in the mid-2010s to match the today used lighter blue shade, but occasionally a few spare darker buses can be seen.

The four metro lines are marked on the map in different colours:
 M1: yellow
 M2: red
 M3: blue
 M4: green

The current livery of the trains on the M2, M3 and M4 lines are white-black, on M1 vehicles are painted yellow, though until recently the trains on M2 and M3 lines were blue (shade between the buses' former and current color).

In pop culture
A surrealistic thriller titled Kontroll was filmed in the M2 and M3 metro tunnels during 2002-2003. The movie has won several awards and has developed a cult following. The ironic beginning of the movie features Botond Aba, former CEO of BKV, who declares that all events and locations shown in the film are purely fictional.

References

External links 
 BKV Zrt.
 Tram Travels: Budapesti Közlekedési Vállalat (BKV)

Public transport companies in Hungary
Transport in Budapest
Intermodal transport authorities in Hungary
1968 establishments in Hungary
Organizations established in 1968